Coronel Pringles is a city in the south of the Buenos Aires Province in Argentina, situated near the mountains of Pillahuincó. It is the government seat of the Coronel Pringles Partido.

In 1882, the provincial government of Buenos Aires created the partido ("civil parish") of Coronel Pringles by dividing the territory of Tres Arroyos into the partidos of Coronel Suárez, Tres Arroyos and Coronel Pringles. The latter, and its main town, were named after Coronel Juan Pascual Pringles, a member of grenadiers regiment of General San Martín's army that fought in the wars of independence against the Spanish.

Its main economic activities are agriculture, and sheep and cattle raising.

History 

 1882: Coronel Pringles partido was created on 10 July and the town on 24 September.
 1890: The first mayor, Felipe S. Medina, was elected.
 1900: The church of Santa Rosa de Lima was inaugurated by the Bishop of La Plata, Monsignor Mariano Espinosa, on 14 January.  The town was linked by telegraph to the rest of the province.
 1903: Opening, on 15 July, of the wide gauge railway line through Coronel Pringles, linking Olavarría and Bahía Blanca, and built by the British-owned company Gran Ferrocarril Sur. This company was later to become part of Ferrocarril General Roca after the railways were nationalised in 1948.
 1905: A branch of the Nacional Bank of Argentina (Banco de la Nación Argentina) was opened.
 1908: Building of the 600-seat Spanish Theater (Teatro Español) was completed.
 1910: On 1 January the Coronel Suárez to Puerto Belgrano section of the broad gauge railway line through Pringles, built by the French-owned company Ferrocarril Rosario y Puerto Belgrano was opened.  The section linking Pringles to Rosario was opened later that year on 15 December.  This railway company was later to become part of Ferrocarril General Bartolomé Mitre after the railways were nationalised in 1948.
 1912: The children's home (Hogar del Niño) was opened.
 1914: The poet Almafuerte visited Pringles and gave a lecture in the Spanish Theater (Teatro Espanol).
 1915: The newspaper El Orden was founded in October.
 1916: The Club Leando N. Alem was founded.
 1919: A branch of the Provincial Bank of Buenos Aires (Banco de la Provincia de Buenos Aires) was opened.
 1928: The Pringles Bank (Banco de Pringles) was founded.
 1930: Television transmissions first received.
 1932: Pringles Public Library (Biblioteca Popular Pringles) was opened.
 1933: The famous tango singer, Carlos Gardel, gave a concert at the Spanish Theater (Teatro Espanol) on 18 May, accompanied by his guitarists Horacio Pottorossi,  Guillermo Barbieri, Domingo Riverol and Julio Vivas.  Barbieri and Riverol died along with Gardel in a plane crash two years later.
 1934: Coronel Pringles was declared a city.
 1938: The constructions of the Town Hall (Palacio Municipal), Municipal Slaughterhouse (El Matadero Municipal), the Main Square (La Plaza) and The Avenue (Las Ramblas) were completed under the direction of the architect Francisco Salamone.
 1938: The Rural Society (La Sociedad Rural) was founded.
 1941: The Flying Club (Aeroclub) and the Electrical Cooperative (La Cooperativa Electrica) were founded.  A local branch of the Rotary Club was founded .
 1944: The Old People's Home (El Hogar de Ancianos) was opened.
 1948: El Fogon de los Gauchos founded.
 1950: The Voluntary Fire Service (El cuerpo de Bomberos Voluntarios) was created.
 1956: El Club de Pesca Social y Deporte was founded.
 1965: The Lions Club (Club de Leones) was founded under the presidency of Augusto Mariani
 1966: Alliance française was set up.
 1968: A local branch office of the newspaper La Nueva Provincia opened.
 1970: On 10 July the writer Jorge Luis Borges gave a talk entitled Los Malones y La Conquista del Desierto (in English: The Indian Resistance and the Conquest of the Desert) in the Municipal de Cultura. 
 1981: The City Cultural Museum (La Casa de Cultura y Museo de la Ciudad) opened.
 1982: An acacia tree was planted by Jorge Luis Borges in the Garden of Historic Trees (Patio de los Árboles Historicos) of the Casa de la Cultura on 12 September to celebrate the centenary of the foundation of Pringles in 1882.

Climate

Mayors of Coronel Pringles

Celebrities born in Coronel Pringles 
Juan Carlos Thorry (1908–2000) film actor, tango musician.
César Aira, writer, born 1949
Arturo Carrera, poet.
Celeste Carballo, singer and composer of rock music.

Access roads

Provincial routes 
 Access to the partido is via Provincial Route 51 or Provincial Route 85.

Train 
Passenger service to Buenos Aires (twice weekly) and Bahia Blanca (twice weekly) operated by Ferrobaires on the Constitución - Bahía Blanca (vía Pringles) line

Air 
 Aerodrome provincial, 3 km southeast of the city. En Route 51 km 617 and Pringles access through 9 de Julio | Tel +(54)(2922) 46-2488
 Airport commander Spore, Location: Bahía Blanca (1 hour by land) on Route 3 North Ex km 675 | IATA Code: BHI, Category: Cabotage | Tel + 54 (291) 486-0300

References

 Centenario de Coronel Pringles, Aldo H. Pirola, Carlos A. Barragan, Editorial Nueva Era, Coronel Pringles, Prov. de Buenos Aires, Argentina (1983).
 Andres M. Regalsky, Foreign Capital, Local Interests and Railway Development in Argentina: French Investments in Railways, 1900–1914, Journal of Latin American Studies, Vol 21, No.3 (October 1989), pp. 425–452.

External links

 Official municipal site

Populated places in Buenos Aires Province
Populated places established in 1882
Cities in Argentina
Argentina